Porto Canal is a Portuguese pay television channel broadcasting from northern Portugal based in Matosinhos. Launched on 29 September 2006, it replaced former NTV (from Porto TV, based in Vila Nova de Gaia) which transformed into RTPN, Radiotelevisão Portuguesa's news channel.

In July 2010, Porto Canal launched three new delegations in Mirandela, Arcos de Valdevez and Penafiel, and in the beginning of 2011, three more in Guimarães, Braga and Vila Real.

In March 2011, Porto Canal announced a partnership with Portuguese sports club F.C. Porto. In August 2011, F.C. Porto assumed the management of Porto Canal, launching two new F.C. Porto related programs, Flash Porto and Somos Porto. Porto Canal also broadcasts live full matches of the F.C. Porto teams of football (only FC Porto B home games), basketball, handball and roller hockey.

In June 2019, FC Porto was sentenced to pay a €2 million fine for publishing and manipulating illegally obtained Benfica emails on Porto Canal. Four years later, judge Carlos Alexandre indicted the club's former director of communication, Francisco J. Marques, the channel's director, Júlio Magalhães, and pundit Diogo Faria for violation of private correspondence or telecommunications, unauthorized access, and offence to a collective person.

Programming
In terms of content the channel airs generalist and regional programming. It focuses primarily on news of the northern region of Portugal, having also many diverse programs.

Since the partnership with FC Porto, it has programs like Flash Porto or 45 Minutos à Porto that broadcast club-related news and information.

Major programs (non-sports)

À Conversa com Ricardo Couto
Caminhos da História
Cinema Batalha
Clube de Cozinheiros
Consultório
Destino Norte
Jornal Diário
Mentes que Brilham
Net Diário
Notícias às 17
Notícias às 18
Notícias às 19
Pólo Norte
Parlamento da Região
Ponto Cardeais
Porto Alive!
Radioativo
Saúde no Tacho
Territórios
Testemunho Directo
Último Jornal
Valter Hugo Mãe

Sports programs (FC Porto)

Azul e Branco
Cadeira de Sonho
Especial Porto
Dragão Caixa
Dragon Force
Flash Porto
Invictos
Portistas pelo Mundo
Somos Porto
45 Minutos à Porto

References

2006 establishments in Portugal
Portuguese-language television stations
Television channels and stations established in 2006
Mass media in Portugal
Television networks in Portugal
Television stations in Portugal
Mass media in Matosinhos